Taulil is a Papuan language  spoken in East New Britain Province on the island of New Britain, Papua New Guinea.

Butam (now extinct) is related. Like the Butam, the Taulil people trace their ancestry to New Ireland.

Phonology
Taulil consonants:

{| class="wikitable" style="text-align:center"
!  !! Bilabial !! Alveolar !! Palatal !! Velar
|-
! Plosive (voiceless)
| p || t ||  || k
|-
! Plosive (voiced)
| b || d ||  || ɡ
|-
! Nasal
| m || n ||  || ŋ 
|-
! Tap/Flap
|  || ɾ ||  || 
|-
! Fricative
| β  ||  ||  || 
|-
! Approximant
|  ||  || j || 
|-
! Lateral Approximant
|  || l ||  || 
|}

References

 

Languages of East New Britain Province
Taulil–Butam languages
Vulnerable languages